Deep Run is a tributary of the North Branch Patapsco River, in Carroll County, Maryland, in the United States.

References

Rivers of Maryland
Rivers of Carroll County, Maryland